Psychostrophia is a genus of moths in the family Epicopeiidae. The genus was erected by Arthur Gardiner Butler in 1877.

Species
Psychostrophia melanargia Butler 1877
Psychostrophia nymphidiaria (Oberthür, 1893)
Psychostrophia picaria Leech, 1897
Psychostrophia endoi Inoue, 1992

References

Epicopeiidae
Moth genera